The blunt-tooth conger (Ariosoma mauritianum) is an eel in the family Congridae (conger/garden eels). It was described by Paul Pappenheim in 1914, originally under the genus Leptocephalus. It is a marine, deep-water dwelling eel which is known from the Indo-West Pacific, including the Red Sea, eastern Africa, and Australia. It is known to dwell at a depth range of 360–800 metres.

References

Ariosoma
Taxa named by Paul Pappenheim
Fish described in 1914